The Jeffrey Epstein VI Foundation was a private foundation established in 2000 by New York convicted sex offender and financier Jeffrey Epstein.  Officially registered as J. Epstein VI Foundation, the "VI" stands for Virgin Islands, where the foundation was based and Epstein owned a private island. The foundation's board included Cecile de Jongh, wife of the former governor of the United States Virgin Islands, John de Jongh.

Activity
In 2003, the foundation pledged $30 million to Harvard University  to establish 
the Program for Evolutionary Dynamics, directed by Martin Nowak, a professor of mathematics and biology. The university received only $6.5 million of this pledge. The foundation also supported NEURO.tv, a video series featuring experts discussing topics related to the brain, and the OpenCog project, an open-source software initiative for Artificial intelligence.

From 2005-2007, the foundation funded the work of geneticist George Church for “cutting edge science & education."

Over the years, the foundation convened many of these scientists in conferences to discuss the consensus on fundamental science topics such as gravity, global threats to the Earth and language.

As a representative of the foundation, Epstein sat on the Mind, Brain and Behavior Advisory Committee at Harvard University, and been  involved in the Santa Fe Institute, the Theoretical Biology Initiative at the Institute for Advanced Study at Princeton, and the Quantum Gravity Program at the University of Pennsylvania. Epstein also served on the Trilateral Commission and the Council on Foreign Relations.

References

External links

The Program for Evolutionary Dynamics 

Scientific research foundations in the United States
2000 establishments in the United States
Foundation